15th Avenue and Taraval is a westbound-only light rail stop on the Muni Metro L Taraval line, located in the Parkside neighborhood of San Francisco, California. The station opened with the first section of the L Taraval line on April 12, 1919. Eastbound trains stop at the nearby Taraval and 17th Avenue station.

Service 
Since August 2020, service along the route is temporarily being provided by buses to allow for the construction of improvements to the L Taraval line. The project is expected to wrap up in 2024.

Planned changes 

Like many stations on the line, 15th Avenue and Taraval has no platforms; trains stop at marked poles before the cross street, and passengers cross parking lanes to board. In March 2014, Muni released details of the proposed implementation of their Transit Effectiveness Project (later rebranded MuniForward), which included a variety of stop changes for the L Taraval line. Transit bulbs would be added to the 15th Avenue and Taraval stop to allow passengers to board without crossing auto traffic; the inbound platform would be moved around the corner onto Taraval.

On September 20, 2016, the SFMTA Board approved the L Taraval Rapid Project. Construction will occur from 2018 to 2020. As proposed in 2014, a bulb would be added at the existing outbound stop location, with a second bulb at the relocated inbound stop.

However, in January 2018, Muni offered a revised proposal in response to community pressure not to close the inbound stop at Taraval and 17th Avenue. The inbound stop at 15th and Taraval would be closed; inbound riders would use the new platform east of 17th Avenue, or the relocated Ulloa and 14th Avenue stop. The outbound stop would remain in service, with the previously planned bulb constructed. The SFMTA Board approved the plan in July 2018.

References

External links 

SFMTA: 15th Ave & Taraval St inbound and outbound
SF Bay Transit (unofficial): 15th Ave & Taraval St

Muni Metro stations
Railway stations in the United States opened in 1919
1919 establishments in California